S. phyllostachydis may refer to:
 Scolicotrichum phyllostachydis, Teng, a fungus species in the genus Scolicotrichum
 Scyphospora phyllostachydis, a fungus species in the genus Scyphospora
 Shiraiella phyllostachydis (synonyms : Mycocitrus phyllostachydis or Ustilaginoidea phyllostachydis, Syd. 1900), a fungus species in the genus Shiraiella
 Solosympodiella phyllostachydis, Matsush., a fungus species in the genus Solosympodiella

See also
 Phyllostachydis (disambiguation)